Elaine Gabrielle Bradley (born October 19, 1984) is an American musician and songwriter, and the drummer for the American rock band Neon Trees.  She has also hosted BYUtv's unscripted series Grace Notes since 2020.

Early life
Elaine Gabrielle Doty, the youngest of seven children, was born October 19, 1984 to Robert and Carolyn Doty. She is a member of The Church of Jesus Christ of Latter-day Saints and volunteered full-time as a missionary in Frankfurt, Germany for eighteen months.  She later earned a B.S. in Public Health and a minor in German from Brigham Young University at the top of her class.

Career
Neon Trees formed in 2005 and Elaine Bradley joined in 2006. Neon Trees gained nationwide exposure in 2008 when their premier single "Animal" topped the Billboard Alternative Songs chart and reached #13 on the Billboard Hot 100, later winning a Billboard Music Award for Top Alternative Song (2011).  They have since released four albums, earned two RIAA double-platinum singles, and toured extensively with other groups including Thirty Seconds to Mars, Angels & Airwaves, My Chemical Romance, Duran Duran, The Offspring, and Maroon 5.

Bradley has filled in as a drummer for The 8G Band for a couple weeks on Late Night with Seth Meyers in 2016 and 2017.

Equipment

Bradley plays Gretsch USA Custom drums in Neon Trees and Gretsch Renown in Noble Bodies. She uses a Gretsch chrome over brass Brooklyn snare and Zildjian cymbals. Her drum heads are Evans. She uses Vic Firth 5A drumsticks. She plays two floor toms in Neon Trees and one in Noble Bodies.

Personal life

Elaine married Sebastian Bradley, a dual German/American citizen, in January 2011 in the Draper Utah Temple. They have four children. She and her family are featured in a video campaign for The Church of Jesus Christ of Latter-day Saints.

Discography

Filmography

Television

References

External links
Neon Trees official site

American rock drummers
Living people
Musicians from Utah
Neon Trees members
1984 births
American women drummers
Latter Day Saints from Utah
Brigham Young University alumni
American Mormon missionaries in Germany
21st-century American women musicians
21st-century American drummers